During the 1995–96 English football season, Brentford competed in the Football League Second Division. After spending over two mid-season months in the relegation places, the club achieved a 15th-place finish. A bright spot was a run to the fourth round of the FA Cup, falling to First Division high-flyers Charlton Athletic.

Season summary
Brentford began the 1995–96 season with the majority of the squad that finished runners-up in the previous season still intact, with Shane Westley, Simon Ratcliffe and Paul Stephenson the only players to depart. Manager David Webb's only addition to the squad during the off-season was Southend United youngster Ijah Anderson. Top scorer Nicky Forster looked set to depart for First Division club Crystal Palace for a £2,000,000 fee, but the Eagles' interest cooled.

A win and a draw from the opening two games of the league season put Brentford in its highest league position of the season (6th), but a run of only four wins from the following 21 games left the club second-from-bottom at the mid-point of the season. With Nicky Forster damaging knee ligaments in October 1995 and his subsequent goalscoring form faltering, Robert Taylor was burdened with leading the team's strikeforce and he finished the season as the club's top scorer, with 16 goals. A memorable 2–1 victory over First Division club Norwich City at Carrow Road on in the FA Cup third round on 6 January 1996 provided the spark needed for a revival of the team's league form, with 19 of a possible 30 points being won between mid-January and mid-March to climb to 13th in the table. Four wins from the final seven matches of the season led Brentford to a 15th-place finish in the Second Division. The FA Cup run ended with a 3–2 defeat at the hands of high-flying First Division club Charlton Athletic in the fourth round.

League table

Results
Brentford's goal tally listed first.

Legend

Pre-season and friendlies

Football League Second Division

FA Cup

League Cup

Football League Trophy

 Source: Statto, The Big Brentford Book Of The Nineties

Playing squad 
Players' ages are as of the opening day of the 1995–96 season.

 Source: The Big Brentford Book Of The Nineties

Coaching staff

Statistics

Appearances and goals
Substitute appearances in brackets.

 Players listed in italics left the club mid-season.
 Source: The Big Brentford Book Of The Nineties

Goalscorers 

 Players listed in italics left the club mid-season.
 Source: The Big Brentford Book Of The Nineties

International caps

Management

Summary

Transfers & loans

Kit

|
|
|

Awards 
 Supporters' Player of the Year: Robert Taylor
 Star Player of the Year: Ijah Anderson
 Littlewoods Giant Killers Award: FA Cup third round

References

Brentford F.C. seasons
Brentford